The 2003 French Open was the second Grand Slam event of 2003 and the 107th edition of the French Open. It took place at the Stade Roland Garros in Paris, France, from May 26 through June 8, 2003.

Both Albert Costa and Serena Williams were unsuccessful in their title defences, both being defeated in the semi-finals by eventual champions Juan Carlos Ferrero and Justine Henin-Hardenne respectively. Ferrero won his first Grand Slam title, defeating Martin Verkerk in the final, and Henin-Hardenne, who had previously won the event in 1997 as a junior, won after defeating Serena Williams, who had won the previous four Grand Slam events, in the semi-final and compatriot and rival Kim Clijsters in the final in straight sets. For Henin-Hardenne, it was the first of seven Grand Slam titles, and the first of four French Open titles.

Seniors

Men's singles

 Juan Carlos Ferrero defeated  Martin Verkerk, 6–1, 6–3, 6–2
It was Ferrero's 3rd title of the year, and his 10th overall. It was his only Grand Slam title.

Women's singles

 Justine Henin-Hardenne defeated  Kim Clijsters, 6–0, 6–4
It was Henin's 4th title of the year, and her 10th overall. It was her 1st of 7 career Grand Slam titles, and the first of her four French Open singles titles.

Men's doubles

 Mike Bryan /  Bob Bryan defeated  Paul Haarhuis /  Yevgeny Kafelnikov, 7–6, 6–3
It was Michael and Robert's 1st career Grand Slam title.

Women's doubles

 Kim Clijsters /  Ai Sugiyama defeated  Virginia Ruano Pascual /  Paola Suárez, 6–7(5), 6–2, 9–7
It was Clijsters's 1st career Grand Slam title.
It was Sugiyama's 2nd career Grand Slam title, and her 1st French Open title.

Mixed doubles

 Lisa Raymond /  Mike Bryan defeated  Elena Likhovtseva /  Mahesh Bhupathi, 6–3, 6–4

Top 5 seeds

Juniors

Boys' singles

 Stanislas Wawrinka defeated  Brian Baker, 7–5, 4–6, 6–3

Girls' singles

 Anna-Lena Grönefeld defeated  Vera Dushevina, 6–4, 6–4

Boys' doubles
 György Balázs /  Dudi Sela defeated  Kamil Čapkovič /  Lado Chikhladze, 5–7, 6–1, 6–2

Girls' doubles
 Marta Fraga Pérez /  Adriana González Peñas defeated  Kateřina Böhmová /  Michaëlla Krajicek, 6–0, 6–3

Notes

External links
 French Open official website

 
2003 in French tennis
2003 in Paris
May 2003 sports events in France
June 2003 sports events in France